Ellis Rubinstein is President Emeritus of the New York Academy of Sciences, which was founded in 1817 and is the fourth oldest scientific society in the United States. Under Rubinstein's leadership as president and CEO for 17 years, the academy's network of experts, young scientists, and partner organizations expanded and became engaged in global partnerships that continue to address many of the planet's challenges.

Rubinstein came to the academy from the scientific journal, Science, where he was Editor for a decade.  During that period, he increased impact and circulation.

Prior to his tenure at Science, Rubinstein was Editor-in-Chief of The Scientist, a Senior Editor at Newsweek, and Managing Editor at Science 85 and IEEE Spectrum, the flagship journal of the engineering profession.

Early life and education
Rubinstein grew up in New York City, earned a B.A. in English literature at the University of California, Berkeley, spent one year in that university's doctoral program and then taught high school English for three years before entering the world of publishing. In 2006, Rubinstein received honorary doctorates from Hallym University in South Korea and from the University of Medicine and Dentistry of New Jersey.

Career
At IEEE Spectrum that Rubinstein's work won a National Magazine Award for his journalistic account of the nuclear accident at Three Mile Island (TMI) and the special issue on TMI which he edited. Under the mentorship of Spectrum Editor-in-Chief, Donald Christiansen, Rubinstein organized and edited a second National Magazine Award-winning issue on the role of science and technology in war and peace. In addition, three other special issues developed and edited by Rubinstein for Spectrum were named National Magazine Award finalists.

From Spectrum, Rubinstein went to Science 85, an innovative magazine translating the advances of science for a highly educated lay audience.  Within months of his arrival as Managing Editor, Rubinstein brought the magazine another National Magazine Award for a four-part series "Technology for Peace."

In 1987, Rubinstein joined Newsweek as one of two Senior Editors overseeing general news coverage. This turned out to be one of the most intense periods in recent US history for newsweeklies.  Rubinstein edited investigative articles for many cover stories: on the Iran-Contra controversies besetting President Ronald Reagan, on the sinking of the Stark, and much more.  During the second half of 1987, Rubinstein took over a section of the magazine devoted to feature articles in science, medicine, religion, and education.  He produced a cover package entitled "The Search for Adam and Eve."  This was the first description for the general public of the then novel DNA-tracing of the origins of modern humans in Africa.  With the exception of editions featuring the Iran-Contra news, this issue became the highest selling edition of Newsweek over a two-year period.

From 1993 to 2002 Rubinstein was Editor of Science magazine.  During his tenure, he conducted the first one-on-one interview with Chinese President Jiang Zemin granted to a Western magazine editor, and President Bill Clinton's first interview with a science magazine.  In addition, Rubinstein authored an investigative account of the cell line in which researcher Robert Gallo grew the AIDS virus.  This article prompted an inquiry by the National Institutes of Health and was the basis for a chapter in a government report.

References

External links 
 New York Academy of Sciences’ Official Website
 IEEE - Special issue: Three Mile Island and the future of nuclear power

Living people
Year of birth missing (living people)
American editors